Oleg, Oleh, or Aleh is an East Slavic given name. The name is very common in Russia, Ukraine and Belаrus. It derives from the Old Norse Helgi (Helge), meaning "holy", "sacred", or "blessed". The feminine equivalent is Olga. While Germanic in origin, "Oleg" is not very common outside Eastern European countries. The English equivalent of Oleg is Alex.

Russian pronunciation

Олег (Oleg) is pronounced [ɐˈlʲek] in Russian. The English pronunciation of Oleg is based on the transliteration of the Cyrillic alphabet, and overlooks three key features of the Russian pronunciation:

 The stress is on the second syllable. In spoken Russian, the initial short unstressed 'O' is reduced to [ɐ], similar to the 'a' as in 'about'.
 The 'л' (l) becomes palatalized to [lʲ] ─ that is, it gains a 'y'-like quality, and but is still most closely approximated by a plain English 'l'.
 The word-final final 'г' (g) is devoiced to [k].

Thus, rather than "Oh-leg", the phonetically closest approximation of the Russian pronunciation of Oleg in English is the name Alec, but with stress on 'E'.

Ukrainian pronunciation

Ukrainian pronunciation of the name 'Олег' is different from Russian, though the same Cyrillic letters are used in writing. Ukrainian 'Олег' is pronounced [oˈlɛɦ] and becomes 'Oleh' in English according to the transliteration rules.

Belarusian spelling and pronunciation 
In Belarusian, the name is spelled and pronounced as "Алег" [aˈlʲeɣ] so that the first letter changes to "A" according to the Belarusian feature of akannye. The last letter is also pronounced differently, which renders the Latin transliteration 'Aleh'.

People named Oleg

Rulers and nobles 
 Oleg of Novgorod, 9th–10th-century leader and conqueror of Kievan Rus'
 Oleg of Drelinia (died 977), ruler of Drelinia
 Oleg I of Chernigov, Oleg Svyatoslavich of Tmutarakan, 11th–12th century Rurikid prince
 Oleg III Svyatoslavich (Prince of Chernigov) (c. 1147–1204)
 Oleg Yaroslavich (1161?–1189), Rurikid prince
 Oleg I of Ryazan, 13th-century prince of Ryazan Principality
 Prince Oleg Konstantinovich of Russia (1892–1914), Russian royalty

Others 
 Oleg Aleynik (born 1989), Russian professional football player
 Oleg Andronic (born 1989), Moldovan footballer
 Oleg Anfimov (1937–2019), Soviet engineer and politician
 Oleg Anofriyev (1930–2018), Soviet and Russian stage and screen actor, voice actor, singer, songwriter, film director, poet
 Oleg Antonenko (born 1971), Belarusian professional ice hockey left wing
 Oleg Antonov (aircraft designer) (1906–1984), Soviet aircraft designer, founder of Antonov ASTC
 Oleg Antonov (volleyball) (born 1988), Russian-born Italian volleyball player
 Oleg Atkov (born 1949), Russian cosmonaut
 Oleg Babenkov (born 1985), Russian professional football player
 Oleg Baklanov (1932–2021), Soviet/Ukrainian politician, scientist and businessman
 Oleg Basilashvili (born 1934), Soviet/Russian film and theatre actor
 Oleg Belyakov (born 1972), Soviet football goalkeeper
 Oleg Berdos (born 1987), Moldovan road bicycle racer
 Oleg Bernov, musician and member of Russian-American rock band Red Elvises
 Oleg Betin (born 1950), the governor of Tambov Oblast in Russia
 Oleg Blokhin (born 1952), Ukrainian football coach
 Oleg Bodrug (born 1965), Moldovan politician
 Oleg Bogayev (born 1970), Russian playwright based in Yekaterinburg
 Oleg Bogomolov, governor of Kurgan Oblast
 Oleg Bolkhovets (born 1976), Russian long-distance runner
 Oleg Borisov (1929–1994), Russian film and theatre actor
 Oleg Bozhev (born 1961), Soviet speed skater
 Oleg Brega (born 1973), Moldovan journalist and activist
 Oleg Bryjak (1960–2015), Kazakhstani operatic bass-baritone
 Oleg Budargin (born 1960), governor of Taymyr Autonomous Okrug in Russia
 Oleg Buryan (born 1959), Russian artist
 Oleg Caetani (born 1956), conductor of Russian and Italian descent
 Oleg Cassini (1913–2006), French-born American fashion designer
 Oleg Chernyshov (born 1986), Russian professional football player
 Oleg Chirkunov (born 1958), governor of Perm Krai, Russia
 Oleg Chistyakov (born 1976), Russian professional football player
 Oleg Crețul (born 1975), Moldovan judoka
 Oleg Dahl (1941–1981), Soviet actor
 Oleg Delov (born 1963), Russian professional football coach and a former player
 Oleg Denishchik (born 1969), triple jumper who represented the USSR and later Belarus
 Oleg Deripaska (born 1968), Russian business oligarch
 Oleg Dineyev (born 1987), Russian footballer
 Oleg Dmitrenko (born 1984), Russian professional football player
 Oleg Dmitriyev (footballer, born 1973) (born 1973), Russian professional footballer
 Oleg Dolmatov (born 1948), former Russian footballer and a current manager
 Oleg Dudarin (born 1945), Russian professional football coach and a former player
 Oleg Dyomin (born 1947), former Ambassador Extraordinary and Plenipotentiary of Ukraine to the Russian Federation
 Oleg Gordievsky (born 1938), Soviet KGB agent who defected to the UK
 Oleg Grabar (1929–2011), French archeologist and historian of Islamic art, working in the United States
 Oleg Ishutkin (born 1975), Russian race walker
 Oleg D. Jefimenko (1922–2009), Ukrainian-American physicist and Professor Emeritus at West Virginia University
 Oleg Dmitriyevich Kononenko (born 1964), Russian cosmonaut
 Oleg Grigoriyevich Kononenko (1938–1980), Soviet cosmonaut
 Oleg Koshevoy (1926–1943), Soviet partisan and co-founder of the Soviet resistance group, the Young Guard
 Oleg Kovalyov (disambiguation), several people
 Oleg A. Korolev (born 1968), Russian artist
 Oleg Ladik (born 1971), Ukrainian-born Canadian Olympic wrestler
 Oleg Losev (1903–1942), Russian scientist and inventor
 Oleg V. Minin (born 1960), Russian physicist
 Oleg Moldovan (born 1966), Moldovan sport shooter
 Oleg Nejlik, Swedish singer
 Oleg Nikolaenko, Russian computer programmer, accused cyber-spammer
 Oleg Novachuk, Kazakh businessman, currently Chief Executive of Kazakhmys
 Oleg Novitskiy (born 1971), Russian cosmonaut
 Oleg Penkovsky (1919–1963), Soviet colonel
 Oleg Pogudin (born 1968), Russian actor and singer
 Oleg Prokofiev (born 1928), Russian artist, son of Sergei Prokofiev
 Oleg Prudius (born 1972), Ukrainian professional wrestler known by his ring name Vladimir Kozlov
 Oleg Rykhlevich (born 1974), Belarusian freestyle swimmer
 Oleg Sadikhov (born 1966), Israeli Olympic weightlifter
 Oleg Sentsov (born 1976), Ukrainian filmmaker, writer and activist
 Oleg Shteynikov (born 1985), Kazakhstani freestyle swimmer
 Oleg Smirnov (disambiguation), several people
 Oleg Stepko (born 1994), Ukrainian and Azerbaijani artistic gymnast
 Oleg Taktarov, (born 1967) Russian mixed martial artist and actor
 Oleg Tverdovsky (born 1976), Ukrainian-Russian ice hockey player
 Oleg Velyky (1977–2010), German handball player
 Oleg Vernyayev (born 1993), Ukrainian gymnast
 Oleg Voloshyn (born 1981), Russian-Ukrainian journalist, political pundit, and former government official

Fictional characters

Television series
 Vanko Oleg Golishevsky, on 2 Broke Girls
 Oleg Igorevich Burov, a Soviet KGB officer played by Costa Ronin on The Americans
 Oleg the Prophet, ruler of Kiev, played by Danila Kozlovsky on Vikings (based on Oleg of Novgorod)
 Oleg Mikcic, portrayed by Karl Herlinger on season 7 of Dexter (TV series)

Movies
 Oleg, Don Shirley's cellist in Green Book (film), played by Dimiter D. Marinov

Video games 
 Oleg, the original name of Teach from Xenoblade Chronicles 3
 Oleg Kirlov, the character in video games Saints Row: The Third, Saints Row IV, Agents of Mayhem

References

Slavic masculine given names
Russian masculine given names
Bulgarian masculine given names
Ukrainian masculine given names
Lists of people by given name